Wishing is the second solo album by English actress-singer Martine McCutcheon. It was released in November 2000 and peaked at #25 in the UK Albums Chart.

Two singles were lifted from the album, both of which charted in the Top 10 of the UK Singles Chart. "I'm Over You" peaked at #2 on 4 November 2000 and "On the Radio", a cover of the 1979 Donna Summer song, charted at #7 in February 2001. Plans for a third single were scrapped when McCutcheon won the lead role in the West End production of My Fair Lady in early 2001.

Track listing
 "I'm Over You"
 "Tonight"
 "Teardrops"
 "On the Radio"
 "Every Time" 
 "Love Changes Nothing"
 "You Mean the World to Me"
 "What You See Is What You Get"
 "Wishing"
 "Cried So Many Nights"
 "Together We Are Beautiful"
 "Everybody"

Charts

Weekly charts

Year-end charts

References

2000 albums
Martine McCutcheon albums
Innocent Records albums